Crni Kao is a village in the municipality of Batočina, Serbia. According to the 2011 census, the village has a population of 410 people.

References

Populated places in Šumadija District
Batočina